Gold Ring (Siwari Al-Dhahab;  Gōrudo Ringu) is a comic written by Qais Sedki of the United Arab Emirates and drawn by Akira Himekawa of Japan. The series is the UAE's first manga. The comic is printed in Arabic; an English version is available through mail order.

When Sedki founded Dubai-based publishing house, Pageflip, he wrote that he wanted to fight the perception that Classical Arabic, associated with schoolwork, was "boring." To help form his comic, Sedki approached a female duo of comic book artists known under the pen name Akira Himekawa and asked for consultation on how to best express the manga style. The Himekawa duo became the artists of the books. Gold Ring was awarded the 2010 Sheikh Zayed Book Award for children's literature.

Volume 2 of Gold Ring was released on March 1, 2012.

In June 2014, Japanese animation studio, Gainax announced they would be developing an anime based on the comic.

Story
The story revolves around Sultan, an Arab boy who watches the Gold Ring falconry competition with his friend Ziad. At the competition they find a caged falcon. Sultan convinces his friend to release the falcon into the wild. The next morning, the falcon is at Sultan's doorstep. Sultan calls the bird "Majd" and trains her for an upcoming falconry competition.

References

External links

Pageflip Publishing
 Pageflip Publishing 
 Gold Ring 
 Interview with Qais Sedki (Part 1) - Sail Magazine
 Interview with Qais Sedki (Part 2) - Sail Magazine
 Thompson, Jason. "Siwari Al-Dhahab: Sharing the Arabic-Japanese Manga Love in Gold Ring." Comixology. October 14, 2010.
 Thompson, Jason and Mikikazu Komatsu. "An Interview with Akira Himekawa & Qais Sedki." Otaku USA. January 12, 2011.

Arts in the United Arab Emirates
Manga series